France national bandy team made an appearance at the 1913 European Bandy Championships, which were played in Davos, Switzerland, but the outbreak of World War I then ended the interest for bandy in France. France is not a member of the Federation of International Bandy.

References

National bandy teams
Bandy